Sosnovka is a rural locality (a village) in Asovskoye Rural Settlement, Beryozovsky District, Perm Krai, Russia. The population was 23 as of 2010.

Geography 
It is located on the Sosnovka River.

References 

Rural localities in Beryozovsky District, Perm Krai